Banana cake is a cake prepared using bananas.

Banana cake may also refer to:
Banana bread, a type of bread that is made with mashed bananas
Banana roll, a common Chinese or Hongkonger pastry